The New York Evening Mail (1867–1924) was an American daily newspaper published in New York City. For a time the paper was the only evening newspaper to have a franchise in the Associated Press.

History

Names

The paper was founded as the New York Evening Mail in 1867 and published under that name through 1877.  It then went through some minor name changes, becoming the New York Mail for about a year (November 1877 – November 1878), and then The Mail (through late 1879).  It then became the Evening Mail from 1879 through December 1881, when owner Cyrus West Field acquired the New York Evening Express (which had been founded by James and Erastus Brooks as a Whig paper in June 1836), and created The Mail and Express. It retained the Mail and Express moniker until 1904, when it eventually became the Evening Mail once again. In 1915 the newspaper was acquired by Edward Rumely with financing from a source in Germany. Rumely felt that most American newspapers were taking a pro British side threatening neutrality.

In January 1924, the paper was merged with the Evening Telegram upon being acquired by Frank Munsey from Henry L. Stoddard.  This later became the New York World-Telegram in 1931.

Early history
On March 20, 1888, Elliott Fitch Shepard purchased the Mail and Express (with an estimated value of $200,000 ($ in ) from Cyrus West Field for $425,000 ($ in ). Deeply religious, Shepard placed a verse from the Bible at the head of each edition's editorial page. As president of the newspaper company until his death, he approved every important decision or policy. Shepard's brother Augustus D. Shepard, who was the vice president, became acting president of the Mail and Express Company on his brother's death.

Mail and Express building
In 1892, the newspaper's owner Elliott Fitch Shepard ordered a new headquarters built. Shepard owned the company from 1888 until his death in 1893. The building was on Broadway, between Fulton and Dey Streets. It was 66 by 25 by 211 feet, ten stories, and was built by Carrère & Hastings (architects of the New York Public Library). The building's dimensions were challenging based on the land purchased, and thus the Buffalo Morning Express wrote that it "looks for all the world like an upright lead pencil". The ground floor featured caryatids representing the newspaper's reach across all "four corners of the world". The building became an architectural landmark, such that after a fire in 1900, the Troy Daily Times wrote that it was "such an ornament to Broadway that its destruction would be a calamity". It was demolished in 1920, following AT&T's plans to expand its building at 195 Broadway to take over nearly the entire block.

In 1907, Rube Goldberg moved to New York, finding employment as a cartoonist with the New York Evening Mail. The New York Evening Mail was syndicated to the first newspaper syndicate, the McClure Newspaper Syndicate, giving Goldberg's cartoons a wider distribution, and by 1915 he was earning $25,000 per year and being billed by the paper as America's most popular cartoonist. Rather than lose Goldberg to Hearst, the New York Evening Mail matched the salary offer and formed the Evening Mail Syndicate to syndicate Goldberg's cartoons nationally.

World War I controversy
The New York Times of July 9, 1918, reported that Edward Rumely, "... vice president, secretary and publisher of the New York Evening Mail, was arrested late yesterday afternoon by agents of the Government, charged with perjury. The charge grew out of a statement filed with A. Mitchell Palmer, the Alien Property Custodian, in which Rumely asserted that The Evening Mail was an American-owned newspaper. The Government is in possession of evidence which, it is held, shows that instead of being owned by Americans, the paper is in fact owned by the Imperial German Government, which on June 1, 1915, paid to Rumely, through Walter Lyon, of the former Wall Street house of Renskorf. Lyon & Co., the sum of $735,000, which transferred the control of the newspaper to the Kaiser."

In July 1918 Rumely was arrested and convicted of violation of the Trading with the Enemy Act. Rumely however denied the allegations, claiming, instead, he had received money to buy the paper from an American citizen in Germany. He had failed to report this when he received the money. He said the charge was baseless, and based on perjured testimony. President Coolidge granted him a presidential pardon in 1925.

Staff
 Rheta Childe Dorr
 Rube Goldberg
 H.L. Mencken
 William Charles Morris
 Harry J. Tuthill

References

External links

Defunct newspapers published in New York City
Newspapers established in 1867
Publications disestablished in 1924
1867 establishments in New York (state)
1924 disestablishments in New York (state)
Daily newspapers published in New York City